RX J1856.5−3754 (also called RX J185635−3754, RX J185635−375, and various other designations) is a neutron star in the constellation Corona Australis. At approximately 400 light-years from Earth, it is the closest neutron star discovered to date.

Discovery and location

RX J1856.5−3754 is thought to have formed in a supernova explosion of its companion star about one million years ago and is moving across the sky at 108 km/s. It was discovered in 1992, and observations in 1996 confirmed that it is a neutron star, the closest to Earth discovered to date.

It was originally thought to be about 150–200 light-years away, but further observations using the Chandra X-ray Observatory in 2002 indicate that its distance is greater—about 400 light-years.

Quark star hypothesis 
By combining Chandra X-ray Observatory and Hubble Space Telescope data, astronomers previously estimated that RX J1856 radiates like a solid body with a temperature of 700,000 °C and has a diameter of about 4–8 km. This estimated size was too small to reconcile with the standard models of neutron stars, and it was therefore suggested that it might be a quark star.

However, later refined analysis of improved Chandra and Hubble observations revealed that the surface temperature of the star is lower, only 434,000 °C, and, respectively, the diameter is larger, about 14 km (with account of the effects of general relativity, the observed radius appears about 17 km). Thus, RX J1856.5–3754 is now excluded from the list of quark star candidates.

Vacuum birefringence

In 2016 a team of astronomers from Italy, Poland, and the U.K. using the Very Large Telescope reported observational indications of vacuum birefringence from RX J1856.5−3754. A degree of polarization of about 16% was measured from the visible spectrum being large enough to support evidence but not discovery due to the low accuracy of star model and the uncertain direction of the neutron magnetization axis. 

Its inferred magnetic effect of 1013 G should produce a greater effect at X-ray wavelength which could be measured by future planned polarimeters such as NASA's Imaging X-ray Polarimeter Explorer (IXPE), NASA's Polarimetry of Relativistic X-ray Sources (PRAXYS) or ESA's X-ray Imaging Polarimetry Explorer (XIPE).

See also 
3C 58, a possible quark star

References
 RX-J185635-375 at jumk.de
 RX J1856.5-3754 and 3C58: Cosmic X-rays May Reveal New Form of Matter Chandra X-ray Observatory. July 16, 2009.
 Walter, Frederick M.; Lattimer, James M., The Astrophysical Journal, 2002

External links

 Is RX J185635-375 a Quark Star?
 
 Bare Quark Stars or Naked Neutron Stars? The Case of RX J1856.5-3754
 RX J185635-3754 - an Isolated Neutron Star
 News Release STScI-1997-32: Hubble Sees a Neutron Star Alone in Space

Corona Australis
Radio-quiet neutron stars
Neutron stars
ROSAT objects